Louisiana's 36th State Senate district is one of 39 districts in the Louisiana State Senate. It has been represented by Republican Robert Mills since 2020, following his 2019 defeat of Republican incumbent Ryan Gatti.

Geography
District 36 covers all of Webster Parish and parts of Bienville, Bossier, and Claiborne Parishes in eastern Ark-La-Tex, including some or all of Ringgold, Springhill, Minden, Plain Dealing, Benton, Haughton, Eastwood, Red Chute, and Bossier City.

The district is located entirely within Louisiana's 4th congressional district, and overlaps with the 1st, 8th, 9th, 10th, 11th, and 13th districts of the Louisiana House of Representatives.

Recent election results
Louisiana uses a jungle primary system. If no candidate receives 50% in the first round of voting, when all candidates appear on the same ballot regardless of party, the top-two finishers advance to a runoff election.

2019

2015

2011

Federal and statewide results in District 36

References

Louisiana State Senate districts
Bienville Parish, Louisiana
Bossier Parish, Louisiana
Claiborne Parish, Louisiana
Webster Parish, Louisiana